Perche Township is one of ten townships in Boone County, Missouri, USA.  As of the 2012, its population was 4,037. The village of Harrisburg is the only incorporated settlement inside the township.

History
Perche Township was established in 1821.

Settled mainly by settlers from the upland south (Kentucky, Virginia, and Tennessee), the township was named after the Roche Perche Creek, the largest stream in Boone County (save the Missouri) and flows from North to South through the middle of the township. The town of Perche, Missouri was located where the original path of the Boone's Lick Road crossed Roche Perche Creek. The town site has long been obliterated. The Church and Cemetery of Red Rock are located near here.

Historical locations

The Geographic Names Information System (GNIS) has the following entries associated with the town of Perche:
Perche (historical) 
Perche Church 
Perche Post Office (historical)

Geography
The township contains one incorporated settlement: Harrisburg. The unincorporated settlement of Dripping Springs is also located here. At least two major cemeteries are located within the township: Dripping Springs and Botner. The Roche Perche is the main stream along with the Silver Fork and Lick Fork. Lick Creek Conservation Area is located near the center of the township.

References

External links
 City-Data.com

Townships in Boone County, Missouri
Townships in Missouri